For census town in West Bengal, India see Baidyanathpur, Paschim Bardhaman
 
Baidyanathpur is a village in Chandpur District in the Chittagong Division of eastern Bangladesh.

References

Populated places in Chandpur District